Peter Prusa (born 19 February 1944) is a German former ice hockey player who competed for SC Dynamo Berlin. He played for the East Germany national ice hockey team at the 1968 Winter Olympics in Grenoble.

References

1944 births
Living people
German ice hockey forwards
Ice hockey players at the 1968 Winter Olympics
Olympic ice hockey players of East Germany
Sportspeople from Rostock
SC Dynamo Berlin (ice hockey) players